Niamana is a rural commune in the Cercle of Nara in the Koulikoro Region of south-western Mali. The commune has an area of 4,985 km2 and contains 39 villages. In the 2009 census the commune had a population of 28,166. The administrative centre is the village of Mourdiah.

References

External links
.

Communes of Koulikoro Region